Datuk Dr.Tengku Rethwan bin Tengku Mansor is a prominent Malaysian businessman who ventured into Selangor state politics. Tengku Rethwan is the chairman of President college. He is one of the Barisan Nasional candidates for GE-13.

Education
Tengku Rethwan started his tertiary education in UiTM and graduated with Diploma in Science in 1975. He then later obtained his MBBS from University Malaya, Bachelor of Law (LLB-London) and currently he is pursuing his PHD on Social Networking in Entrepreneurship at the University of Amsterdam.

Knighthood
Tengku Rethwan was awarded the Darjah Paduka Tuanku Jaafar [DPTJ], Negeri Sembilan in the year 2000 which carries the title Datuk.

President College Chairman
As the Chairman of President College Kuala Lumpur, Tengku Rethwan believes that education lies in the development of industry driven knowledge, practical skills and character development. He is also the founder of the college.

References

1954 births
Living people
People from Selangor
Malaysian businesspeople
Malaysian people of Malay descent
Malaysian Muslims